Aacharyan is a 1993 Indian Malayalam film, directed by Ashokan and starring Thilakan, Suresh Gopi and Sreenivasan in the lead roles. The story is about an investigative journalist who tracks down a drug trafficking gang with the help of a retired civil servant and an ex-police officer.

Plot
Sivashankaran (Sreenivasan), a journalist, goes in search of the truth regarding the death of Jeevan Kumar, a college student. He is determined to bring the criminals to justice.

Cast
Thilakan as Krishna Menon IAS
Suresh Gopi as DySP Azad	
Sreenivasan as Journalist Shivashanker or Shiva
Jagathy Sreekumar as Chief Reporter Prabhakaran or Prabhu
Janardhanan as Raveedranath	
Vineeth as Abraham or Ebru
Shari as Sumithra Shivashanker
 Rajeev Nanayankar as Unni
Yashoda Wimaladharma as Rekha Raveedranath
Cleetus Mendis as Abdulla Koya
Mahesh as Jevankumar
K. P. A. C. Azeez as Azad's father
Prathapachandran
K. P. Ummer as Alaxander Priest 
Kollam Thulasi as Chief Minister

Soundtrack
The music was composed by Ouseppachan and the lyrics were written by Bichu Thirumala.

References

External links
 

1993 films
1990s Malayalam-language films
Films scored by Ouseppachan